Philip David Welch (born 6 January 1954) is a British mathematician known for his contributions to logic and set theory.  He is Professor of Pure Mathematics at the School of Mathematics, University of Bristol. He is currently President of the British Logic Colloquium (2017), Vice-President of the European Set Theory Society (2018), and the Coordinating Editor of the Journal of Symbolic Logic (2016).

Biography

Welch attended Lancing College. After obtaining a BSc in mathematics from University College London in 1975, he attended Exeter College at the University of Oxford, taking an MSc in mathematical logic in 1976 and his DPhil in 1979, under the supervision of Robin Gandy. His dissertation was entitled Combinatorial Principles in the Core Model.

He worked as an assistant at the Seminar für Logik at the University of Bonn from 1980 to 1981, then as an SERC Research Fellow at Wolfson College, Oxford, from 1981 until 1983. Following a Royal Society European Research Fellowship at the University of Bonn, and the Free University of Berlin (1984), he held a position as an assistant professor at UCLA until 1986. In 1997 he left Bristol in order to set up a research group in set theory at the Graduate School of Science and Technology at  Kobe University, Japan. He subsequently held a Guest Professorship at the Kurt Gödel Research Center at the University of Vienna (2000–2001) and a Mercator Professorship at the University of Bonn (2001) before returning to Bristol in 2002. He was appointed as a Professor there in 2004.  Apart from research articles he is co-author with Aaron Beller and Ronald Jensen
of Coding the Universe.

References

External links
 
 Home page of Philip Welch at Bristol

1954 births
Living people
Alumni of University College London
Alumni of Exeter College, Oxford
20th-century English mathematicians
21st-century English mathematicians
Academics of the University of Bristol
University of California, Los Angeles faculty
20th-century British philosophers
21st-century British philosophers